is a passenger railway station located in the town of Sayō, Sayō District, Hyōgo Prefecture, Japan. It is operated by the third-sector semi-public railway operator Chizu Express.

Lines

Station layout
The station consists of two elevated opposed side platforms with the station building underneath. Platform 1 is the main platform and is used by trains operating both directions. Platform 2 is the secondary platform and is used only for changing trains and waiting for passing trains. The station is unattended.

Platforms

Adjacent stations

|-
!colspan=5|Chizu Express

History
Kuzaki Station opened on December 3, 1994 with the opening of the Chizu Line.

Passenger statistics
In fiscal 2018, the station was used by an average of 80 passengers daily.

Surrounding area
 Chikusa River
 Sasagaoka Park

See also
List of railway stations in Japan

References

External links

 Official home page

Railway stations in Hyōgo Prefecture
Railway stations in Japan opened in 1994
Sayō, Hyōgo